The N.W.A Legacy, Volume 1: 1988–1998 is a two-disc compilation by album released on March 23, 1999 through Priority Records. It is composed of 26 songs recorded from 1988 to 1998 by the American hip-hop group N.W.A, including solo material of its members Ice Cube, Eazy-E, Dr. Dre and MC Ren, and their affiliates such as The D.O.C., Above The Law, Da Lench Mob, Snoop Dogg, Penthouse Players Clique, Tha Dogg Pound, Westside Connection and 2Pac. Bryan Turner served as executive producer.

The album peaked at number 77 on the Billboard 200 and number 42 on the Top R&B/Hip-Hop Albums chart in the United States. It was certified Platinum by the Recording Industry Association of America on September 30, 2002.

Its sequel, The N.W.A Legacy, Vol. 2, was released in 2002.

Track listing

Charts

Certifications

References

External links

N.W.A albums
1999 compilation albums
G-funk compilation albums
Hip hop compilation albums
Gangsta rap compilation albums
Priority Records compilation albums
Ruthless Records compilation albums